Annie Conway (born 21 June 1981) is a British female mountain runner who won the World Long Distance Mountain Running Championships in 2016.

She also won the Snowdon Race in 2017.

References

External links
 Annie Conway at Association of Road Racing Statisticians

1981 births
Living people
British female mountain runners
British fell runners
Sportspeople from Cumbria
World Long Distance Mountain Running Championships winners